Charles Desmarets, was a French knight. He was a son of Antoine des Marets.

In 1435, Desmarets captured Dieppe from the English garrison and set about expanding and improving the castle.

An English army led by John Talbot, Earl of Shrewsbury besieged Dieppe between 2 November 1442 until 14 August 1443. The Dieppe garrison was led by Desmarets.  The English siege was broken by a relief army led by the Dauphin Louis.

Marriage and issue
He married Marie des Essarts, dame de Lignières, they had the following known issue:
Philippe des Marets, Seigneur de Saint-Aubin-en-Caux
Jehanne des Marets
Christophe des Marets
Louise des Marets
Marie des Marets

Citations

References

Year of birth unknown
Year of death unknown
15th-century French  people